The 1956 Aintree 100 was a non-championship Formula One race held on 24 June 1956. The race was won by Horace Gould, in a privately entered Maserati 250F.

Results

References

Aintree
1956 in British motorsport